The Billboard Top Latin albums chart, published in Billboard magazine, is a record chart that features Latin music sales information. This data are compiled by Nielsen SoundScan from a sample that includes music stores, music departments at electronics and department stores, internet sales (both physical and digital) and verifiable sales from concert venues in the United States.

There were twenty-two number-one albums in 2007, including two releases by Mexican band RBD: Celestial and Empezar Desde Cero. Celestial, the last number-one album of 2006, spent five weeks at number one and sold 498,000 units; this album became the best-selling Latin album of 2007. Empezar Desde Cero debuted at the top of the chart and sold 102,000 units. Vencedor, the last recording by Mexican performer Valentín Elizalde, who was killed at the age of 27 on November 25, 2006 in the city of Reynosa, Tamaulipas, spent three non-consecutive weeks at the top of the chart. La Llave de Mi Corazón by Dominican singer-songwriter Juan Luis Guerra spent one week at number one and won five Latin Grammy Awards, including Album of the Year and the Grammy Award for Best Tropical Latin Album. The greatest hits collection Historia de un Idolo by Vicente Fernández became the first album to peak at number one in 2001 and 2007.

The first Spanish-language release by Jennifer Lopez, Como Ama una Mujer, debuted at number 10 in the Billboard 200 and also peaked at number one on the chart for four consecutive weeks. La Radiolina by Manu Chao debuted within the Top 10 in the album charts from Austria, Belgium, France, Italy, México, The Netherlands, Norway, Spain, Sweden and Switzerland; it also spent one week at number one in the chart during the week of September 22, 2007. The soundtrack for the movie El Cantante, mainly performed by Marc Anthony, was the second soundtrack to peak at number one, ten years after the compilation album for the movie Dance with Me did so in 1997 (see: Top Latin Albums of 1997). Reggaeton performer Daddy Yankee had his first top 10 album on the Billboard 200, as El Cartel: The Big Boss debuted at number nine with 82,000 units sold, enough to be the number-one album on the chart during the week of June 23, 2007.

Albums

References

2007 Latin
United States Latin Albums
2007 in Latin music